Club Deportivo Ferriolense is a Spanish football team based in Son Ferriol, in the autonomic community of Balearic Islands. Founded in 1965 it plays in Tercera División Group 11, holding home games at Estadio Municipal de Son Ferriol, with a 3,000-seat capacity.

Season to season

30 seasons in Tercera División

References

External links
Futbolme team profile 

Football clubs in the Balearic Islands
Sport in Palma de Mallorca
Association football clubs established in 1965
1965 establishments in Spain